Old Mother Riley in Society is a low budget 1940 black and white British comedy film, directed by John Baxter, and starring Arthur Lucan and Kitty McShane. It is the fifth in the long running Old Mother Riley series, and features the screen debut of Jimmy Clitheroe as the boot boy in a high society household.

Plot
Old Mother Riley does the laundry for the dancers in the pantomime "Aladdin", where her daughter Kitty works as a chorus girl. Sneaking a peek at the show one day, Mother Riley accidentally pops up through a trap door onto the stage.  Accosted by the angry star, Mother Riley’s belligerent responses have the audience in stitches. Outraged, the star walks out, leaving Kitty to take over the leading role, to great success.  Kitty is congratulated after the show by wealthy high society boy Tony Morgan, and the couple start to fall in love. Tony and Kitty eventually marry and move into the Morgan family mansion, taking Mother Riley with them, as Kitty’s personal maid.  During a swanky party to introduce Kitty to Tony's upper class friends, rumours start up about Kitty’s former stage career.  Kitty is about to confess her past, but Mother Riley — fearing this will have damaging effect on her daughter’s social standing — causes a disruption, then leaves a goodbye note and vanishes.  Kitty tells Tony the truth, and the couple hire a detective to trace Mother Riley, but without success.  Mother Riley works her way through a variety of dead end jobs after separating from Kitty, and ends up living in a dingey hostel and picking up degrading casual work as a dishwasher.  A chance encounter with old friend Tug Mulligan results in her reunion with Kitty; Tony’s family explains they’re not "high society" after all, merely "nouveau riche". "We made our money in sausages", declares Lady Morgan; "then we're all friends together", replies Mother Riley.

Cast
Arthur Lucan as Old Mother Riley
Kitty McShane as Kitty
John Stuart as Tony Morgan
Minnie Rayner as Hotel Washer-Up
Charles Victor as Sir John Morgan
Ruth Maitland
Athole Stewart as Duke
Peggy Novak
Dennis Wyndham as Tug Mulligan
Margaret Halstan as Duchess
Aubrey Dexter as Nugent

Critical reception
TV Guide observed, "the series served its purpose and kept the theater patrons laughing."
MerDB describes the film as having a "dose of sentiment in addition to the slapstick. The first half of the film very much follows the usual routine of boisterous humor, but the second half departs from the norm, as Mother Riley (estranged from her daughter Kitty after her marriage), seeks to become reunited with her."
Mexcine wrote, " based on a story by Kitty McShane...The picture is chiefly a mother-daughter melodrama akin to Madame X and Imitation of Life, with Mother Riley sacrificing her happiness so her daughter can successfully “pass” in high society."

External links

References

1940 films
1940 comedy films
British comedy films
1940s English-language films
British black-and-white films
1940s British films